Harry Gordon may refer to:
Harry Gordon (entertainer) (1893–1957), Scottish entertainer, comedian and impressionist
Harry Gordon (footballer) (1931–2014), Scottish footballer
Harry Gordon (journalist) (1925–2015), Australian journalist and Olympic historian
Harry L. Gordon (1860–1921), American politician in Ohio

See also

Henry Gordon (disambiguation)
Harold Gordon (disambiguation)